So far in 2023, there has been no clear trend for oil prices, though concerns over U.S. interest rates have kept oil from rising as much as it could have.

2023
Both Brent and WTI started the year down more than 8 percent, the most for a first week since 2016. Brent finished at $78.57 and WTI at $73.77, after gaining 13 percent in the previous three weeks. U.S. jobs news indicated the economy was slowing, meaning less chance of another large interest rate increase, and the dollar jumped. The price of Saudi light crude sold to Asia fell to the lowest since November 2021. Oil rose for the next two weeks, with Brent ending at $87.63 and WTI at $81.31, with loosening of restrictions in China a big reason, along with expectation of smaller interest rate increases. A lower oil rig count and the Russian cap also contributed, though U.S. crude inventories were the highest since June 2021. For the week ending February 3, oil fell nearly 8 percent, with Brent at one point reaching $79.72, lowest since January 11, and WTI reaching $73.13, lowest since January 5. Both fell about 3 percent on February 3 with positive U.S. jobs news causing concerns about interest rate increases, even though the Federal Reserve raised rates less than it had been. The next week oil rose over 8 percent, with Brent finishing at $86.39 and WTI at $79.72, as Russia announced production cuts. The European Union's cap and its ban on Russian oil were believed to have had influence, but gains were limited by low Chinese demand, increased U.S. unemployment claims and high inventories. Positive U.S. economic news, higher U.S stockpiles and lower stock prices helped oil fall for a second week, with Brent hitting $84.18 and WTI at $77.52. In spite of higher U.S. inventories, because of Russia's plans to decrease output, WTI climbed 2 percent to $75.39 on February 23 after falling for 6 straight days. Brent finished at $82.21, also up 2 percent. At the end of February, U.S. crude exports reached a record due to the growing gap between WTI and Brent.

In the first full week of March, oil fell 3 percent due to concerns about U.S. and European interest rates, though not as much as it could have due to good U.S. economic news, with Brent finishing at $82.68 and WTI at $76.68. The next week, as a result of the March 2023 United States bank failures, Brent fell almost 12 percent to $72.97 a barrel, the most since December, and WTI fell 13 percent to $66.74, the most in a year.

References

See also
2011–2013 world oil market chronology
2014–2016 world oil market chronology
2017–2019 world oil market chronology
2020–2022 world oil market chronology
2021–2023 global energy crisis

External links 
 U.S. DOE EIA energy chronology and analysis
 Oil Price History and Analysis

Oil market timelines
2000s energy crisis